Adam Clay "A.C." Thompson (born c.1972 Robinson, Eugene S., "THE PUNK ROCK JOURNALIST MAKING REAL NEWS AT THE SOURCE", ozy.com, OCTOBER 31, 2017) is an investigative journalist and staff reporter with ProPublica. His work has appeared on the PBS series Frontline.

He was a reporter for the San Francisco Bay Guardian, SF Weekly, and the Center for Investigative Reporting.
He was faculty at New College of California, and instructor in the Media Studies Graduate Program.
He teaches at the Raising Our Voices program, to train street reporters.

Awards
2005 George Polk Award for Local Reporting for his series “Forgotten City,” about San Francisco's public housing
2013 Elijah Parish Lovejoy Award for investigative journalism in connection with the shooting of civilians by police after Hurricane Katrina.
 2013 Honorary Doctorate from Colby College
 2021 Nominated for 2021 Peabody Award for his work co-producing the American Insurrection news coverage.

Publications with others
Torture Taxi. Co-authored with Trevor Paglen. Brooklyn, NY: Melville House Publishing, 2006. .
Icon, 2007. .

References

External links
"AC Thompson", Specious Species
Terror in Little Saigon: New Doc Ties US-Allied Kill Squad to Unsolved Murders of Vietnamese Journos In US, Democracy Now! November 11, 2015,

American investigative journalists
Year of birth missing (living people)
Living people
George Polk Award recipients
New College of California faculty
Elijah Parish Lovejoy Award recipients